Gabrielle Rose Rennie (born 7 July 2001) is a New Zealand footballer who plays as a forward for the Arizona State Sun Devils in the NCAA Division I and for the New Zealand women's national team. She was part of the New Zealand team in the football competition at the 2020 Summer Olympics. She scored her first international goal on debut against Australia at the Olympics in a 2–1 loss.

Early life
Rennie attended Rangiora High School, where she was a Deputy Head Girl. She studied for an exercise and science degree at Indiana University, Bloomington.

College career
Rennie signed with Indiana University to play for the Indiana Hoosiers for the 2020 season. Rennie scored her first collegiate goal in a 2–1 win over Michigan State.

Club career
Rennie played for Canterbury United Pride in the New Zealand Women's National League, winning the competition in 2018 scoring 6 goals, 2019 scoring 7 goals and 2020 as top goal scorer with 7 goals.

International career
Rennie was part of the New Zealand U-17 team who created history by winning New Zealand's first medal at a FIFA World Cup, when they came 3rd at the 2018 FIFA U-17 Women's World Cup in Uruguay.

Career statistics

International goals
Scores and results list New Zealand's goal tally first, score column indicates score after each Rennie goal.

Honours

Club
Canterbury United Pride
 National Women's League: 2018, 2019, 2020

Individual
 National Women's League top-goalscorer: 2020

International
New Zealand U-17
 FIFA U-17 Women's World Cup: 3rd Place, 2018
 OFC U-16 Women's Championship: Winners, 2017

New Zealand U-20
 OFC U-19 Women's Championship: Winners, 2019

References

External links
 

2001 births
Living people
New Zealand women's association footballers
New Zealand women's international footballers
Footballers at the 2020 Summer Olympics
Olympic association footballers of New Zealand
People educated at Rangiora High School
Indiana Hoosiers women's soccer players
Arizona State Sun Devils women's soccer players
Women's association football forwards
Expatriate women's soccer players in the United States
New Zealand expatriate sportspeople in the United States
New Zealand expatriate women's association footballers
Sportspeople from Rotorua